Wazir Zada (born ) is a Pakistani social activist and politician who was a member of the Provincial Assembly of Khyber Pakhtunkhwa. He is the first Kalasha to become the member of Provincial Assembly of Khyber Pakhtunkhwa.

Early life and education
He was born in Chitral. He completed his matriculation and college from Chitral. Later he received his master's degree in Political Science from the University of Peshawar.

He is a social activist for rights of Kalash people.

Political career
He joined Pakistan Tehreek-e-Insaf (PTI) in 2009.

He was elected to the Provincial Assembly of Khyber Pakhtunkhwa as a candidate of PTI on a reserved seat for minorities in 2018 Pakistani general election., where he stands as having none religion.

References

Living people
1984 births
Pakistani animists
Pakistani activists
Khyber Pakhtunkhwa MPAs 2018–2023
People from Chitral
Kalash people
University of Peshawar alumni
Pakistan Tehreek-e-Insaf MPAs (Khyber Pakhtunkhwa)